Cryptophycita deflandrella is a moth of the family Pyralidae first described by Émile Louis Ragonot in 1893. It is found in Sri Lanka.

References

Pyralinae
Moths of Asia
Moths described in 1893